All Things Considered is a British radio programme produced by BBC Radio Wales, which addresses topics concerning religion, morality and spirituality.  Presented by Reverend Roy Jenkins and Peter Baker, the show airs Sundays at 8.31am and is repeated Wednesdays at 6.32pm.

Awards
All Things Considered has won several awards, including the Andrew Cross Award for best British speech-based religious radio programme for four consecutive years, and the 2005 Sandford St. Martin Trust Merit Award for their show on meditation featuring prisoners at Cardiff Prison.

References

External links

BBC Radio Wales programmes